Balticopta is a fossil genus of minute air-breathing land snails, terrestrial pulmonate gastropod molluscs in the family Gastrocoptidae from Eocene Baltic amber. It includes one species, B. gusakovi.

References

Links
MolluscaBase - Balticopta
ZooBank - Balticopta

Stylommatophora
Fossil taxa described in 2020